Pseudochromis yamasakii, the dottybelly dottyback, is a species of ray-finned fish from the northwest Pacific Ocean around Japan, which is a member of the family Pseudochromidae.

Entymology
The fish is named for Kimihiro Yamasaki, who collected the holotype specimen and provided photographs of the new species.

References

yamasakii
Taxa named by Anthony C. Gill
Taxa named by Hiroshi Senou
Fish described in 2016